Araidanga Assembly constituency was an assembly constituency in Malda district in the Indian state of West Bengal.

Overview
As a consequence of the orders of the Delimitation Commission, Kharba Assembly constituency and Araidanga Assembly constituency cease to exist from 2011. There are two new constituencies in the area – Chanchal Assembly constituency and Malatipur Assembly constituency. Araidnaga is now part of Ratua Assembly constituency.

Araidanga Assembly constituency was part of Malda (Lok Sabha constituency)

Members of Legislative Assembly

Election results

1977–2006
In the 2006, 2001, 1996 and 1991 state assembly elections, Sabitri Mitra of Congress won the Araidanga assembly seat defeating her nearest rivals Sadiqul Islam of CPI(M) in 2006, Setara Begum of CPI(M) in 2001 and 1996, and Habib Mustafa of CPI(M) in 1991. Contests in most years were multi cornered but only winners and runners are being mentioned. Habib Mustafa of CPI(M) defeated Abdul Hannan of Congress in 1987, Sajjad Ahmed of Congress in 1982 and Md. Gofurur Rahaman of Congress in 1977. Prior to that the Araidanga seat did not exist.

References

Former assembly constituencies of West Bengal
Politics of Malda district